Beyond the Farthest Star may refer to:

 Beyond the Farthest Star (novel), a 1942 novel by Edgar Rice Burroughs
 Beyond the Farthest Star (film), a 2015 film
 "Beyond the Farthest Star" (Star Trek: The Animated Series), a 1973 episode of the animated television series Star Trek

See also 
 Farthest Star, a 1975 novel by Frederik Pohl, in collaboration with Jack Williamson
 In extremis (disambiguation)